WVLF (96.1 FM) is a radio station broadcasting a mix of adult contemporary and hot adult contemporary format.  Licensed to Norwood, New York, United States, the station is currently owned by Stephens Media Group.

The station was previously owned by Martz Communications Group, and was acquired by Stephens as of February 1, 2008.

Following a weekend of a repeating loop of announcements airing the weekend of July 6, 2008, WVLF became "The Valley's New Mix 96.1," beginning at 6AM on Monday, July 7, 2008.  The station now airs a Bright Adult Contemporary format covering St. Lawrence county (NY), and Cornwall, ON including the United Counties of Stormont, Dundas and Glengarry.

External links
mymix961.com

VLF